Typocaeta togoensis is a species of beetle in the family Cerambycidae. It was described by Adlbauer in 1995.

References

Agapanthiini
Beetles described in 1995